The Embassy of the United States of America in Tehran was the American diplomatic mission in the Imperial State of Iran. Direct bilateral diplomatic relations between the two governments were severed following the Iranian Revolution in 1979, and the subsequent seizure of the embassy in November 1979.

History

The embassy was designed in 1948 by the architect Ides van der Gracht, the designer of the Embassy of the United States in Ankara. It was a long, low two-story brick building, similar to American high schools built in the 1930s and 1940s. For this reason, the building was nicknamed "Henderson High" by the embassy staff, referring to Loy W. Henderson, who became America's ambassador to Iran just after construction was completed in 1951.

The US diplomatic mission has been defunct and the building has not been used by the U.S. since the Iran hostage crisis of 1979. Since then, the United States government has been represented in Iran by the United States Interests Section of the Embassy of Switzerland in Tehran. The name given to the compound by the embassy's occupiers and still used by many Iranians is variously translated as "den of spies", "espionage den," "den of espionage", and "nest of spies".

After the fall of the embassy, the Revolutionary Guard used it as a training center, and continue to maintain the complex. The brick walls that form the perimeter (the embassy grounds are the size of a city block) feature a number of anti-American murals commissioned by the government of Iran. The site has also housed a bookstore and a museum. Part of the embassy has been turned into an anti-American museum, and several student organizations maintain offices in the former embassy complex. As of January 2017, the site is open to the Iranian public and foreigners. The Great Seal of the United States is badly damaged, but still visible at the entryway.

The Muslim Student Followers of the Imam's Line published documents seized in the embassy (including painstakingly reconstructed shredded documents) in a series of books called "Documents from the US Espionage Den". These books included telegrams, correspondence, and reports from the United States Department of State and Central Intelligence Agency, some of which remain classified to this day.

U.S. Interests Section of the Swiss Embassy 

When diplomatic relations were broken, the United States appointed Switzerland to be its protecting power in Iran. Informal relations are carried out through the United States Interests Section of the Swiss Embassy. Services for American citizens are limited. The section is not authorized to perform any U.S. visa/green card/immigration-related services.

In February 2009, the Iranian police arrested Marco Kämpf, the Swiss diplomat acting as the First Secretary of the US Interests, after finding him with an Iranian woman facing him in the driver's seat of his official diplomatic car. He was immediately recalled to Switzerland.

Former Iranian Embassy in Washington, D.C.

The U.S. State Department seized the former Iranian Embassy in Washington, D.C. in retaliation for the seizure of the U.S. Embassy in Tehran. The Iranian Interests Section operates out of the Pakistani Embassy.

See also

 Iran hostage crisis
 Iran–United States relations
 List of ambassadors of the United States to Iran
 Embassy of the United Kingdom, Tehran
 Tehran American School
 Consulate-General of the United States, Tabriz

References

External links
 hosts a gallery of photographs taken from inside the US Embassy during the crisis.
 400 Pages of Still-Classified CIA and State Dept Documents Seized From the US Embassy in Tehran.
متن کامل و تحلیل اسناد لانه جاسوسی آمریکا (The Full Text and Analysis of the Documents from the US Espionage Den)
Inside The Former US Embassy In Tehran, Iran
Documents from the U.S. Espionage Den
Photograph of the embassy gates, 2008 (on flickr)
Embassy of Switzerland - Foreign Interests Section
U.S. Department of State page for Iran
Virtual Embassy of the United States, Tehran (not a physical presence in Iran)

Iran–United States relations
Buildings and structures in Tehran
Tehran
United States
Iran hostage crisis